Terrell Edwin Horne III (1978–2012) was a senior chief petty officer with the United States Coast Guard, who was killed in the line of duty while intercepting smugglers, on December 2, 2012.

Horne had fourteen years service in the Coast Guard and was second in command of the Marine Protector class cutter USCGC Halibut on the night he was killed in action.
He was aboard  the Halibuts pursuit boat when it was sent to intercept the smugglers.  When they were ordered to heave to, the smugglers rammed Horne's boat and his head was fatally struck by their propeller.
Horne is credited with pushing the coxswain out of the path of danger at the cost of his own life.

On July 30, 2014, the Coast Guard Commandant, Paul Zukunft, announced that the Coast Guard would name a Sentinel class cutter after Horne.  All of the cutters will be named after enlisted members of the Coast Guard, or one of its precursors, who were recognized as heroes.

References

External links

1978 births
2012 deaths
United States Coast Guard non-commissioned officers
Recipients of the Coast Guard Medal
American military personnel killed in action